Sackville is a civil parish in Westmorland County, New Brunswick, Canada.

For governance purposes it is divided between the town of Sackville, the incorporated rural community of Beaubassin East, and the local service district of the parish of Sackville.

All governance units are members of the Southeast Regional Service Commission.

Origin of name
The parish was named in honour of Lord George Sackville, later Secretary of State for the Colonies.

History
Sackville was established in 1772 as a Nova Scotia township.

Sackville was erected as one of Westmorland County's original parishes in 1786 with enlarged boundaries; most of the modern town of Shediac was added.

In 1827 the northern part of Sackville was included in the newly erected Shediac Parish.

In 1880 the boundary with Westmorland Parish was altered, adding a large inland area to Sackville.

In 1894 the existing boundaries were made retroactive to the erection of the parish.

Boundaries
Sackville Parish is bounded:

 on the north by the prolongation of a line running south 83º 45' east from the southern side of the mouth of Fox Creek, beginning about 5.75 kilometres past the Memramcook River and running easterly to a point about 200 metres east of Chemin des Moulins in Saint-André-LeBlanc;
 on the northeast by a line running north 38º 30' west from the southeast angle of lot number one, granted to Otho Reed, at the mouth of Gaspereau Creek in Port Elgin;
 on the southeast by a line beginning about 8 kilometres southeasterly of Route 940, then running south 45º west to Brooklyn Road, then turning slightly more westerly and running to Robinson Brook, then down Robinson Brook and Goose Creek to Big Jolicure Lake, then through the lake to a point on the western shore about 1.6 kilometres southeast of Brooklyn Road, then south 57º 30' west to the prolongation of Route 940 and Goose Lake Road, then south-southeasterly along the Goose Lake Road prolongation to the Aulac River, then downstream to the Cumberland Basin;
 on the south by the Cumberland Basin and Chignecto Bay;
 on the west by Shepody Bay and a line beginning at the junction of Ralph Stiles Road and Route 935 and running northeasterly 102 chains (about 2.1 kilometres) along the southeastern line of a grant to John Sherwood and its prolongation to a point about 100 metres south of Route 106, then running north 11º east to the starting point.

Communities
Communities at least partly within the parish. bold indicates an incorporated municipality or rural community

 Aboushagan Road
  Anderson Settlement
  Beaubassin East
  British Settlement
 Brooklyn
 Brooklyn Road
 Centre Village
 Cherry Burton
 Coles Island
 Cookville
 Evans
 Fairfield
 Johnson's Mills
 Lower Rockport
  Midgic
 Mount View
  Rockport
 Upper Rockport
  Upper Sackville
  Ward
 West Sackville
  Westcock
 Wood Point
  Woodhurst
  Sackville
 Frosty Hollow
  Middle Sackville
  Ogden Mill

Bodies of water
Bodies of water at least partly within the parish.

 Aulac River
 Gaspereau River
  South Branch Memramcook River
 Tantramar River
 Log Lake Stream
 Allen Creek
 Goose Creek
 Green Creek
 Harvey Creek
 Johnson Creek
 Morice Creek
 Wood Creek
  Cumberland Basin
 Chignecto Bay
 Shepody Bay
 Pink Rock Lake
 more than ten other officially named lakes

Other notable places
Parks, historic sites, and other noteworthy places at least partly within the parish.
 Johnson's Mills Protected Natural Area

Demographics
Parish population total does not include town of Sackville and portion within Beaubassin East

Population

Language
Mother tongue (2016)

Access routes
Highways and numbered routes that run through the parish, including external routes that start or finish at the parish limits:

Highways

Principal Routes

Secondary Routes:

External Routes:
None

See also
List of parishes in New Brunswick

Notes

References

External links
 Rural community of Beaubassin East
 Town of Sackville

Local service districts of Westmorland County, New Brunswick
Parishes of Westmorland County, New Brunswick